is a private junior college in Minokamo, Gifu, Japan, established in 1955.

External links
 Official website 

Educational institutions established in 1955
Private universities and colleges in Japan
Universities and colleges in Gifu Prefecture
1955 establishments in Japan
Japanese junior colleges
Minokamo, Gifu